Radio Corporation of America v China was a 1935 arbitral proceeding to determine whether a concession granted by the government of China (specifically the Chinese National Council of Reconstruction) for operation of radio communications between the United States and China was exclusive and could be considered to prohibit a similar concession to another company.

Background
The Radio Corporation of America (RCA) was founded in 1919. At the time all radio or telegraphic traffic between China and the US, including official communications, was run through either German radio or British cables. Therefore, US Navy wanted a reluctant RCA to seek a concession in China (even though RCA's other Asian concessions were operating at a loss). RCA agreed and the transmitter was completed in 1928. When the Mackay Radio & Telegraph Company, also an American interest, signed a similar agreement with China in 1932, RCA claimed it was a breach of contract.

Decision
The tribunal said the initial concession could not be construed as limiting the government's powers:

The Chinese Government can certainly sign away a part of its liberty of action, and this also in the field of international radio-telegraphic communications, and of its cooperation therein. It can do so as well in an implicit manner, if a reasonable construction of its undertakings leads up to that conclusion. It will, as any other party, be bound by law and by any obligations, legally accepted. But as a sovereign government, on principle free in its restriction of its freedom of action, unless the acceptance can be ascertained distinctly and beyond a reasonable doubt.

References

Permanent Court of Arbitration cases
RCA
Concessions in China
Radio communications